Brendan McLoughlin (Irish: Breandán Mac Lochlainn) is an Irish former hurler and Gaelic footballer who played as a goalkeeper and midfielder at senior level for O'Tooles and the Dublin county team.

Hurling career

Club

At club level, McLoughlin was a dual player  with O'Tooles GAA club and played in the Dublin Senior Hurling Championship and the Dublin Senior Football Championship.

He is a winner of four senior hurling championships in 1995, 1996, 1997 and 2002.

County

McLoughlin was a member of the Dublin senior hurling team from 1995 to 2006. He was a contributor to the Last Man Standing: Hurling Goalkeepers book by Christy O'Connor.
 McLoughlin has acted as an analyst for the Dublin senior hurling team.

Honours
O'Tooles
 Dublin Senior Hurling Championship: 
 Winners (4): 1995, 1996, 1997, 2002
 Runners-up (1): 2011
 Dublin Senior Hurling League:
Winners (1): 2006

Individual
Dublin Hurler of the Year: 2000

References

Sources

Notes

Year of birth missing (living people)
Living people
Dual players
Dublin inter-county hurlers
O'Tooles Gaelic footballers
O'Tooles hurlers